Josefine Preuß (born 13 January 1986) is a German television actress.

Early life
Preuß was born in Zehdenick, Brandenburg, near Berlin with an older sister. She won the Brandenburg Junior Championships in rhythmic gymnastics in 1993.

Career
Her breakthrough role was Anna Reichenbach in Schloss Einstein (Einstein Castle), a broadcast for children, in which she starred from 1999 to 2001. Preuß also starred in numerous other movies and broadcasts like Abschnitt 40 or Klassenfahrt - Geknutscht wird immer. She won the German TV Award for Best Supporting Actress in 2005. Since 2005, she has been playing Lena, the lead role in the family comedy Türkisch für Anfänger (Turkish for Beginners). As "Josi" she hosts Quergelesen, a TV show for children about books. As a voice actor, she performed the German voices for Mary Katherine in the 2013 film Epic and as Judy Hopps in the 2016 film Zootropolis.

Selected filmography

References

External links 

 

1986 births
Living people
People from Zehdenick
German film actresses
German child actresses
German television actresses
21st-century German actresses